AD 54 (LIV) was a common year starting on Tuesday (link will display the full calendar) of the Julian calendar. At the time, it was known as the Year of the Consulship of Lentulus and Marcellus (or, less frequently, year 807 Ab urbe condita). The denomination AD 54 for this year has been used since the early medieval period, when the Anno Domini calendar era became the prevalent method in Europe for naming years.

Events

By place

Roman Empire 
 October 13 – Emperor Claudius dies, possibly after being poisoned by Agrippina, his wife and niece, and is succeeded by Nero.
 Nero attempts to prohibit the gladiatorial games.
 Under Nero, Rome annexes Aden to protect the maritime route between Alexandria and Asia.
 Two centurions are sent to the south of Egypt to find the source of the Nile, and possible new provinces. They report that while there are many cities in the desert, the area seems too poor to be worthy of conquest.
 Gnaeus Domitius Corbulo arrives in the East and takes up an assignment as governor of Asia, with a secret brief from Nero and his chief ministers, Seneca and Burrus, to return Armenia to the Roman Empire.
 Corbulo inspects a base of Legio X Fretensis in Syria, at Cyrrhus; the Roman legionaries are demoralized by a "long peace". Many soldiers  sell their helmets and shields.
 Corbulo recruits Syrian auxiliary units in the region and stations them in border forts, with orders from Nero not to provoke the Parthians.
 Violence erupts in Caesarea regarding a local ordinance restricting the civil rights of Jews, creating clashes between Jews and pagans. The Roman garrison, made up of Syrians, takes the side of the pagans. The Jews, armed with clubs and swords, meet in the marketplace. The governor of Judea, Antonius Felix, orders his troops to charge. The violence continues and Felix asks Nero to arbitrate.  Nero sides with the pagans, and relegates the Jews to second-class citizens. This decision does nothing but increase the Jews' anger.
 In Britain, Venutius leads a revolt against his ex-wife Cartimandua, queen of the Brigantes and a Roman ally. Governor Aulus Didius Gallus sends her military aid, and after some indecisive fighting a legion commanded by Caesius Nasica defeats the rebels (approximate date – some time between 52 and 57).
 Winter – Domitius Corbulo marches his legions (Legio VI Ferrata and Legio X) into the mountains of Cappadocia and makes camp. He gives the men a harsh training, twenty-five-mile marches and weapons drills.

Judea 
 Judea is returned piecemeal to Herod Agrippa's son Marcus Julius Agrippa between 48 and 54.

By topic

Religion 
 Patriarch Onesimus succeeds Stachys the Apostle as Patriarch of Constantinople.
 Paul of Tarsus begins his third mission.
 Apollos, a later assistant of Paul, is converted to Christianity in  Ephesus.

Deaths 
 October 13 – Claudius, Roman emperor, possibly poisoned by his wife Agrippina (b. 10 BC)
 Ban Biao, Chinese historian and official (b. AD 3)
 Domitia Lepida the Younger, widow of Marcus Valerius Messalla Barbatus, mother of Valeria Messalina and former mother-in-law of Claudius (b. 10 BC)
 Gaius Stertinius Xenophon, Greek physician, possibly poisoned Claudius
 Marcus Junius Silanus, Roman consul (b. AD 14)
 Stachys the Apostle, Byzantine bishop and saint

References 

0054

als:50er#54